Robert Odu (born 30 April 1999) is a Nigerian professional footballer who currently plays as a forward for Hong Kong Premier League club Resources Capital.

Club career
In June 2019, Odu was loaned from his club Star Base to Nigeria National League club First Bank until the end of the season.

On 30 November 2019, Remo Stars acquired Odu on a two-year loan with an option to buy.

On 28 October 2020, it was announced that Odu had signed with Hong Kong Premier League club Happy Valley.

On 1 August 2022, Odu joined Saudi Arabian club Qilwah.

On 23 February 2023, Odu returned to Hong Kong and joined Resources Capital.

Career Statistics

Club

References

External links
 
 
 

1999 births
Living people
Nigerian footballers
Nigerian expatriate footballers
Hong Kong Premier League players
Primera Federación players
Saudi Second Division players
Happy Valley AA players
Extremadura UD footballers
Qilwah FC players
Resources Capital FC players
Association football forwards
Nigerian expatriate sportspeople in Hong Kong
Nigerian expatriate sportspeople in Spain
Nigerian expatriate sportspeople in Saudi Arabia
Expatriate footballers in Hong Kong
Expatriate footballers in Spain
Expatriate footballers in Saudi Arabia